Nurse attorneys are individuals who are licensed as both lawyers and nurses. Nurse attorneys are found in a number of practice areas including academia, administrative law, litigation, risk management & patient safety, and regulatory compliance.

References 

Health care occupations
Legal professions